Sean Iain Walker (born November 13, 1994) is a Canadian professional ice hockey defenceman for the  Los Angeles Kings in the National Hockey League (NHL). 

Undrafted, he previously played college ice hockey for Bowling Green State University where he was twice named to the All-WCHA Second Team.

Playing career 
Walker began his minor hockey career playing for the Georgina Blaze AA hockey in Keswick Ontario. He then moved up to play with York Simcoe Express AAA in the Eastern AAA Hockey League. Following the York Simcoe Express, Walker played Junior ice hockey with Georgina Ice for the 2011–12 season. While playing in his first season with Georgina Ice, Walker was called up by the Newmarket Hurricanes, Georgina Ice's Junior "A" ice hockey affiliate, for five games. He then spent one season with the Newmarket Hurricanes, tallying 24 points in 53 games. It was during his first full year with the Hurricanes that Walker committed to playing college ice hockey at Bowling Green State University.

Collegiate
In his freshman year at Bowling Green University, he played in 38 games. His 13 points that season ranked second among Falcon rookies as he helped guide them to the 2014 WCHA Men's Ice Hockey Tournament. However, the Bowling Green Falcons lost in the Semi-Finals to Minnesota State. In his sophomore year, Walker played in all 39 games of the season and had a +10 on-ice rating. At the end of the season, Walker was awarded the team's Jim Ruehl Best Defensive Player award.

In October 2015, Walker was named the captain of the Bowling Green Falcons. At the conclusion of his junior year, and first as a captain, Walker was named to the All-WCHA Second Team. He was again named captain for his senior year and named to the All-WCHA Second Team for the second time. Following his senior year at Bowling Green University, Walker signed with the Ontario Reign of the American Hockey League (AHL) to begin his professional career.

Professional
Walker made the Reign's 2017–18 opening night roster out of training camp. He scored his first professional point in a 7–4 loss to the Cleveland Monsters on October 27, 2017. Walker ended the season having played in 64 regular season games for the Reign and collecting 28 points.

Walker signed a two-year, entry level contract with the Los Angeles Kings on July 3, 2018 after playing one season in the AHL. Walker began the 2018–19 season with the Reign after being cut from training camp. After playing in seven games for the Reign, and collecting six points, Walker was recalled from the Reign to the NHL on October 22, 2018. He made his NHL debut on October 23 against the Dallas Stars and recorded his first NHL point in his debut with an assist on Tyler Toffoli's second period goal. After playing in three games, Walker and teammate Austin Wagner were re-assigned to the AHL. Walker was recalled to the NHL on December 21, and scored his first career NHL goal on December 31 against the Colorado Avalanche. He scored in the first period to help the Kings take the lead but the goal was called back due to goalie interference. Walker scored again later that game in the second period, and the goal was upheld. The Kings won the game 3–2 in overtime. On January 3, 2019, while playing with the Kings, Walker was selected to the Pacific Division All-Stars for the 2019 American Hockey League All-Star Classic.

Walker participated in the Kings training camp and made their 2019–20 opening night roster. He skated in 70 games for the club, scoring 24 points as the Kings failed to make the 2020 Stanley Cup playoffs. On September 11, 2020, the Kings signed Walker to a four-year, $10.6 million contract extension.

Personal life
Walker graduated from Our Lady of the Lake Catholic College School in 2012.

Career statistics

Regular season and playoffs

International

Awards and honours

References

External links
 

1994 births
Living people
Bowling Green Falcons men's ice hockey players
Canadian ice hockey defencemen
Ice hockey people from Ontario
Los Angeles Kings players
Ontario Reign (AHL) players
Undrafted National Hockey League players